No Plan B, also known as the Roger Daltrey Band, is an English rock band assembled by The Who singer Roger Daltrey to support performances and tours outside The Who. Daltrey's band includes Simon Townshend (brother of Pete Townshend) on guitar and vocals, Frank Simes on lead guitar, Jon Button on bass, Loren Gold on keyboards and Scott Devours on drums. Frank Simes is also musical director for the band. In a 2010 appearance on The Alan Titchmarsh Show, Daltrey called the band No Plan B.

History

In 2009 Roger Daltrey embarked on a tour of the U.S. and Canada with a new band assembled in Los Angeles, California. During 2010, the band performed as the support act for Eric Clapton, as well as performing additional solo shows.
 
In 2011, the band embarked on the Tommy Reborn tour, which included a special benefit show for the Teenage Cancer Trust (of which Daltrey is a patron) at the Royal Albert Hall in London on March 24, 2011. Pete Townshend joined the band onstage at this show for the songs "The Acid Queen" and "Baba O'Riley", and violinist Charlie Siem played the violin solo in "Baba O'Riley". In 2011 the band toured the UK performing The Who's Tommy, followed by dates in Europe, the US and Canada.  The AEG Live-produced tour North American tour launched in Hollywood, Florida, at the Seminole Hard Rock September 13 and wrapped in Calgary, Alberta at the Scotiabank Saddledome. All shows were well-received, and the band booked additional dates in Europe and Japan for 2012.

Set lists have included music from The Who, from Daltrey's solo albums, and various covers of other material including two songs from Largo, a little-known 1998 album which Daltrey has specified onstage. Harmonies performed by Daltrey's band has allowed them to perform Who songs that have remained unperformed since as far back as the 1960s. At the October 12, 2009 show in Seattle, Pearl Jam singer Eddie Vedder joined Daltrey on stage for performances of Pearl Jam's "Better Man" and The Who's "The Real Me" and "Bargain". The band was joined on stage by Ronnie Wood, Paul Weller, Kelly Jones and Michael Miley at the 28 March 2012 Royal Albert Hall performance for the Teenage Cancer Trust.

Set list

2009
"Who Are You"
"The Real Me"
"Pictures Of Lily"
"Behind Blue Eyes"
"Tattoo"
"Days of Light"
"Freedom Ride"
"Gimme A Stone"
"Going Mobile"
"I'm A Man"/"My Generation Blues"
"I Can See For Miles"
"Squeeze Box"
"Who's Gonna Walk On Water"
"Young Man Blues"
"Baba O'Riley"
"Johnny Cash Medley"
"Born on the Bayou"
"Naked Eye"
"Blue, Red & Grey"
"Without Your Love"

Other songs:
"A Second Out" (until October 28)
"Two Thousand Years" (only on October 10)
"Boris The Spider" (only on October 10 and 22)
"Cache Cache" (only on October 10)
"Giving It All Away" (only on October 12)
"Better Man" (only on October 12)
"Shakin' All Over" (only on October 12 and 14)
"Bargain" (only on October 12)
"The Kids Are Alright"
"Pinball Wizard"
"Won't Get Fooled Again" (only on October 14)
"Summertime Blues" (only on October 14 and 17)

Tour dates

2009 U.S. Tour (The Use It or Lose It Tour)
10/10/09: Commodore Ballroom - Vancouver
12/10/09: Showbox SODO - Seattle, Washington
14/10/09: "Oracle Event" - San Francisco, California
15/10/09: San Manuel Indian Casino - Highland, California
17/10/09: Orpheum Theatre - Los Angeles, California
18/10/09: Humphrey's - San Diego, California
20/10/09: Paramount Theatre - Denver, Colorado
22/10/09: WinStar Casino - Thackerville, Oklahoma
24/10/09: Hard Rock Cafe - Biloxi, Mississippi
25/10/09: Florida Theatre - Jacksonville, Florida
28/10/09: Durham PAC - Durham, North Carolina
30/10/09: Ryman Auditorium - Nashville, Tennessee
31/10/09: Horseshoe Southern - Elizabeth, Indiana
02/11/09: House Of Blues - Chicago, Illinois
03/11/09: House Of Blues - Cleveland, Ohio
05/11/09: Casino Rama Ent Centre - Orillia
07/11/09: MGM Grand Theatre at Foxwoods - Mashantucket, Connecticut
08/11/09: House Of Blues - Boston, Massachusetts
11/11/09: Wellmont Theatre - Montclair, New Jersey
13/11/09: The Borgata - Atlantic City, New Jersey
14/11/09: The Borgata - Atlantic City, New Jersey
17/11/09: Count Basie Theatre - Red Bank, New Jersey
18/11/09: Chrysler Theatre Hall - Norfolk, Virginia
20/11/09: Nokia Theatre Times Square - New York, New York
22/11/09: The Fillmore - Charlotte, North Carolina
24/11/09: North Charleston CColosseum- North Charleston, South Carolina
25/11/09: House Of Blues - Buena Vista, Florida
27/11/09: Barbara Mann Performing Arts Hall - Fort Myers, Florida
29/11/09: Hard Rock Arena - Hollywood, Florida
30/11/09: Ruth Eckerd Hall - Clearwater, Florida

2010
The following dates were performed in support of Eric Clapton:
25/2/2010: Mellon Arena - Pittsburgh, Pennsylvania
27/2/2010: Sommet Center - Nashville, Tennessee
28/2/2010: BJCC Arena - Birmingham, Alabama
02/3/2010: BOK Center - Tulsa, Oklahoma
03/3/2010: Sprint Center - Kansas City, Missouri
05/3/2010: FedEx Forum - Memphis, Tennessee
06/3/2010: New Orleans Arena - New Orleans, Louisiana
08/3/2010: RBC Center - Raleigh, North Carolina
09/3/2010: Gwinnett Center - Atlanta, Georgia
11/3/2010: BankAtlantic Center - Sunrise, Florida
13/3/2010: Amway Center - Orlando, Florida
During The Summer, Roger also performed the following solo dates:
22/6/2010: Anselmo Valencia Tori Amphitheater - Tucson, Arizona
23/6/2010: HP Tech Forum - Las Vegas, Nevada
25/6/2010: Stiefel Theatre - Salina, Kansas
26/6/2010: Uptown Theater - Kansas City, Missouri
These were followed by more dates supporting Clapton:
28/6/2010: Marcus Amphitheater (Summerfest) - Milwaukee, Wisconsin
30/6/2010: Riverbend Music Center - Cincinnati, Ohio
02/7/2010: Verizon Wireless Music Center - Indianapolis, Indiana
03/7/2010: DTE Energy Music Theatre - Detroit, Michigan

2011 (Tommy Reborn Tour)
19/3/2011: O2 Academy - Bournemouth, UK
24/3/2011: Royal Albert Hall - London, UK
03/7/2011: Civic Hall - Wolverhampton, UK
04/7/2011: The Sage - Gateshead, UK
06/7/2011: Clyde Auditorium - Glasgow, UK
07/7/2011: Bridgewater Hall - Manchester, UK
09/7/2011: Royal Centre - Nottingham, UK
10/7/2011: Newport Centre - Newport, UK
12/7/2011: Colston Hall - Bristol, UK
13/7/2011: Cliffs Pavilion - Westcliff-on-Sea, UK
15/7/2011: GuilFest - Guildford, UK
16/7/2011: Broadlands - Hampshire, UK
19/7/2011: City Hall - Hull, UK
21/7/2011: Indigo2 - London, UK
22/7/2011: Blickling Hall - Norwich, UK
24/7/2011: IndigO2 - London, UK
26/7/2011: Marlay Park - Dublin, Ireland
28/7/2011: Royal Hall - Isle of Man
30/7/2011: Lokerse Festival - Lokeren, Belgium
31/7/2011: Valdemars Slot - Tåsinge, Denmark
13/9/2011: Hollywood, Florida Seminole Hard Rock 
15/9/2011: Alpharetta, Georgia Verizon Wireless Pavilion 
17/9/2011: Boston, Massachusetts Agganis Arena 
18/9/2011: Newark, New Jersey Prudential Center 
21/9/2011: Philadelphia, Pennsylvania MANN Center 
23/9/2011: Uniondale, New York Nassau Coliseum 
24/9/2011: Hartford, Connecticut XL Center 
27/9/2011: Montreal, Quebec Place Des Arts 
28/9/2011: Ottawa, Ontario Scotiabank Place 
30/9/2011: Toronto, Ontario Sony Centre For The Performing Arts 
1/10/2011: Windsor, Ontario The Coliseum at Caesars Windsor 
4/10/2011: Minneapolis, Minnesota U.S. Bank Theater at Target Center 
7/10/2011: Hammond, Indiana Venue at Horseshoe Casino 
8/10/2011: St. Louis, Missouri Peabody Opera House 
11/10/2011: Cedar Park, Texas Cedar Park Center 
12/10/2011: Grand Prairie, Texas Verizon Theatre 
14/10/2011: Kansas City, Missouri The Midland by AMC 
16/10/2011: Broomfield, Colorado 1STBANK Center 
19/10/2011: Los Angeles, California NOKIA Theatre 
21/10/2011: San Jose, California San Jose Civic 
22/10/2011: Paradise, Nevada The Joint 
24/10/2011: Portland, Oregon Rose Quarter-Theatre of the Clouds 
25/10/2011: Seattle, Washington KeyArena at Seattle Center 
27/10/2011: Vancouver, British Columbia Rogers Arena 
29/10/2011: Edmonton, Alberta Rexall Place 
30/10/2011: Calgary, Alberta Scotiabank Saddledome
Dates cancelled: 
1/11/2011: Saskatoon, Saskatchewan Credit Union Centre 
2/11/2011: Winnipeg, Manitoba MTS Centre

2012
15/1/2012: Yeovil, England, The Mermaid Hotel
9/3/2012: Padova, Italy, Teatro Geox
11/3/2012: Genova, Italy, Teatro Carolo Felice
12/3/2012: Torino, Italy, Teatro Colosseo
15/3/2012: Paris, France, L'Olympia Gerard Drouot
18/3/2012: Trieste, Italy, Teatro Rossetti
20/3/2012: Firenze, Italy, Teatro Comunale
21/3/2012: Rome, Italy, Auditorium Della Conciliazione
23/3/2012: Rome, Italy, Auditorium Della Conciliazione
24/3/2012: Milan, Italy, Teatro Smeraldo
28/3/2012: London, England, Royal Albert Hall
23/4/2012: Tokyo, Japan, Tokyo International Forum
24/4/2012: Tokyo, Japan, Tokyo International Forum
27/4/2012: Kanagawa, Japan, Kanagawa Kenmin Hall
28/4/2012: Osaka, Japan, Osaka Archaic Hall
30/4/2012: Nagoya, Japan, Nagoya Shi Kokaido

Notes

References

External links
Eddie Vedder sings "Bargain" with No Plan B
Pete Townshend plays with No Plan B
Roger Daltrey at The Who Concert Guide

Musical groups established in 2009
Musical groups from Los Angeles
Rock music groups from California